Samuel Aldino Brunelli (born December 13, 1943) is a former American football offensive lineman who played six seasons with the Denver Broncos of the National Football League (NFL). He played college football at Colorado State College and attended Weldon Valley High School in Weldona, Colorado.

References

External links
Just Sports Stats

Living people
1943 births
Players of American football from Colorado
American football offensive linemen
Northern Colorado Bears football players
Denver Broncos (AFL) players
Denver Broncos players
People from Fort Morgan, Colorado